Appletown is an unincorporated community in Washington County, Maryland, United States.

References

Unincorporated communities in Washington County, Maryland
Unincorporated communities in Maryland